Ryan Todd McDougle (born November 9, 1971) is an American politician. A Republican, he served in the Virginia House of Delegates from 2002 until 2006. He was elected to the Senate of Virginia. Since 2006, he has represented the 4th district, representing six counties and part of a seventh.

Early life 
McDougle was born in Hanover, Virginia, on November 9, 1971.

Career 
Over the course of 13 years between 2006 and 2019, Mcdougle proposed approximately 487 bills and passed 58.3% of the bills in 2019. McDougle was a leading critic of the 2011 redistricting of the Virginia Senate.

Gun control 
Following the Virginia Tech shooting, McDougle, along with delegate Bill Janis, proposed several gun control senate bills. McDougle successfully sponsored Senate Bill 226, which enforced a new law which required firearm purchasers to be asked whether they ever have been involuntarily committed to mental health treatment.

Cannabis 
McDougle supports the use of cannabis. However, he opposes use of cannabis in an apartment complex. Senate bill 1406, is an ongoing bill which will legalize cannabis in Virginia, under certain circumstances. McDougle opposed this bill.

Electoral history

2007 
Unopposed

2011 
Unopposed

2015 
Unopposed

2019

References

External links 

Republican Party Virginia state senators
Republican Party members of the Virginia House of Delegates
Virginia lawyers
James Madison University alumni
William & Mary Law School alumni
People from Hanover, Virginia
1971 births
Living people
21st-century American politicians